The Coppa del Mediterraneo was a summer association football friendly tournament that took place in Genoa, Italy, from 1990 to 1994. The tournament were played at the Stadio Marassi.

In 1990 the teams played 2 round-robin matches. Since 1992 the teams played 3 round-robin 45-minute matches. If any match ended in a draw, it was decided by penalties.

Finals

References

External links
 Coppa del Mediterraneo at Rec.Sport.Soccer Statistics Foundation.

Defunct Italian football friendly trophies
1990–91 in Italian football
1992–93 in Italian football
1994–95 in Italian football